Upland is a former rural locality in the Barcaldine Region, Queensland, Australia.

On 22 November 2019 the Queensland Government decided to amalgamate the localities in the Barcaldine Region, resulting in five expanded localities based on the larger towns: Alpha, Aramac, Barcaldine, Jericho and Muttaburra. Upland was incorporated into Aramac.

Geography 
Upland is within the Desert Uplands area of Central West Queensland. In the centre of the locality is Lake Dunn, a small freshwater lake. The principal land use is cattle grazing.

The locality is bounded to the north-west by Lake Galilee, a large salt lake.

Education 
There are no schools in Upland. The nearest school is in Aramac which offers prep to Year 10 education. There is no Year 11 and 12 education available near Upland, except via distance education.

Attractions 
There are cabin and camping facilities at Lake Dunn. Popular activities are bird watching, fishing, swimming, water skiing, windsurfing, sailing and picnicking.

There is a sculpture trail alongside the road from Aramac to Lake Dunn and Rangers Valley. There are over 30 sculptures by local artist Milynda Roberts of animals and outback living.

References 

Barcaldine Region
Unbounded localities in Queensland